Norma is a food discount store with more than 1,300 stores in Germany, France, the Czech Republic and Austria. The stores are appearing as Norma and Norma-Rodi, as Norma has acquired the company Rodi.

Company 
In 1921, the family company George Roth in Fürth, Germany, was founded. Out of this company, in the 1960s, the first Norma store opened in the south of Germany. Since the end of the 1980s, Norma has developed from a regional discount store to an international company. On April 5, 2010 the company owner Manfred Georg Roth died. The company is managed by a dual leadership consisting of Gerd Köber and Robert Tjón. In December 2011, the general partner changed its legal form from a GmbH to a foundation based in Fürth. The limited partnership was then renamed Norma Lebensmittelfilialbetrieb Stiftung & Co. KG. Another foundation was set up to manage the real estate holdings.

Concept 
In common with other large German discount supermarket chains such as Aldi and Lidl, Norma's central retail concept is to offer a narrow product line of high-turnover foods at low prices.

External links 

Norma

References 

Supermarkets of Germany
Supermarkets of France
Supermarkets of Austria
Supermarkets of the Czech Republic
Companies based in Nuremberg
Fürth
Multinational companies headquartered in Germany
Economy of Bavaria
Food retailers of Europe
1964 establishments in Europe
Retail companies of Germany